The Democratic Communist Circle (French: Cercle communiste démocratique, CCD; French pronunciation: [sεʀkl kɔmynist demɔkʀatik]) was a left-wing, political group founded by Boris Souvarine in February 1926 under the original name of the cercle communiste Marx et Lénine.

Origins
The Democratic Communist Circle was formed as the re-branded version of a previous communist group called the Marx and Lenin Communist Circle (French: Cercle Communiste Marx et Lénine). The Marx and Lenin Communist Circle (MLCC) was founded in 1926 to 'keep alive marxist, revolutionary critical thought'. On 1 December 1930, the MLCC opted to change its name to the Cercle Communiste Démocratique  in order to 'better differentiate itself from the many other communist groups active in French Marxist–Leninist revolutionary circles'.

The DCC's full origins, principles and organisational structure were published at length in the Bulletin Communiste No. 32-33 of July 1933.

Political stance
Through its official journal, the Bulletin Communiste (until 1933), and then via the independently published la Critique Sociale, the DCCs influential members defended a marxist critical analysis of politics and culture. Their most distinctive trait was a sharp criticism of Bolshevik state capitalism embodied in the Soviet Union from the mid 1920s onwards.

In an attempt to demonstrate the inadequacy of Bolshevik state capitalism, the DCC published lengthy accounts of its writers' travels within the Soviet Union via the Bulletin Communiste. These accounts of daily-life in Soviet villages, towns and cities painted a desolate and miserable picture of life in the Soviet Union during the 1920s. An account published in the Bulletin Communiste of 1930 on the 'Soviet situation at the end of 1929' read: 
 
It is a true terror. A terror that takes two forms. The first are the tribunals who condemn whole blocks of people to death. You would be charged with a supposed assassination attempt against some person of authority, or for some attempt to burn a kolkhoz and so two, three, four 'kulaks' were shot. In Kimry, a little town of koustari-cobblers, the administration wants to shut a church, and so a crowd offers passive opposition by regrouping en masse in front of the doors while shouting their disagreement - without the least bit of violence, but nevertheless, five are singled out by Soviet authorities and sentenced to death. In Abkhazia, for a reason everyone ignores, nine have been condemned to death. In Siberia, some 15 to 20 will be shot on Monday for offering some passive resistance to the kolkhoz, etc, etc.
The second terror were the officers of the GPU, who, we could almost say, shot peasants indiscriminately.

Notable members
Amongst its members the DCC counted Boris Souvarine, the writers Raymond Queneau, Georges Bataille, the economist Lucien Laurat and two future leaders of the French Resistance Jean-Jacques Soudeille and Pierre Kaan, the philosopher Simone Weil was invited to join, but chose not to join due to conflicts with Bataille.

Extracts from the Bulletin Communiste
 'An idea is marking out its path within revolutionary circles-that of a new party. Our conception seemed abstract to the empiricists always ready to predict an event...after it happened. The years have passed. The irremediable decline of communiste parties, already clear for us due to their bolshevisation, seems less and less doubtful to the most optimistic of the clear-headed thinkers. And since there is no way to rejuvenate the thoughts or actions of the degenerate socialist parties, the question thus must be imposed, that of a new party.'
 'The Circle declares itself communist without differientiating between the principles of socialism and communism.'
 'The Soviet state is now nothing but the extension and instrument of the Bolshevik Party, who have themselves become a spoliatic bureaucratic caste.'  
 'With Marx and Engels, the Circle affirms itself as democratic, by which we means we stress a contrast with the faux communists who renege on their democratic principles and the faux socialistes who degrade it from the inseparable notion of the revolutionary idea.'
 'The emancipation of workers will be the result of the workers themselves, and not professional revolutionaries, parliamentarians or trade unionists.'
 'The relationships evolved rapidly in the Internationale where the Moscow Political Bureau exercised an authority that was becoming more and more imperative, if not becoming an absolute dictatorship [...]. At the end of this process, all former traces of democratic process had disappeared from the international communist movement.'

References

External links
 www.bibnumcermtri.fr/spip.php?rubrique21
 www.collectif-smolny.org/article.php3?id_article=531
 www.souvarine.fr/qui-sommes-nous.html
 http://www.critique-sociale.info/67/les-vies-de-boris-souvarine/

Political parties established in 1926
Defunct political parties in France